Mallotus cumingii is a species of the spurge family (Euphorbiaceae). It is found in Southeast Asia. It is known locally by the name apanang.

cumingii